Paddy Kingsland (born 30 January 1947) is a composer of electronic music best known for his incidental music for science fiction series on BBC radio and television whilst working at the BBC Radiophonic Workshop. Educated at Eggar's Grammar School in Alton, Hampshire, he joined the BBC as a tape editor before moving on to become a studio manager for BBC Radio 1. In 1970 he joined the Radiophonic Workshop where he remained until 1981. His initial work was mostly signature tunes for BBC radio and TV programmes before going on to record incidental music for programmes including The Changes, two versions of The Hitchhiker's Guide to the Galaxy (the second radio series and the TV adaptation), as well as several serials of Doctor Who. His work on the latter series included incidental music for several serials in the early 1980s.

Other well-known series which contained music composed by Paddy Kingsland are Around the World in 80 Days and Pole to Pole, both travel series by Michael Palin. He also composed music for many schools' television series including Words and Pictures, Rat-a-tat-tat, Watch, Numbercrew, Storytime, English Express, Music Makers, Hotch Potch House and the Look and Read stories "Joe and the Sheep Rustlers" and "The Boy from Space". And Blips

Since leaving the BBC, Kingsland has composed music for the KPM music library, television, commercials and corporate videos. He also owns his own studio, PK Studios.

In 1973, Fourth Dimension, a compilation of his early signature tune work for the Radiophonic Workshop, was released and in 2002 his incidental scores for the Doctor Who serials "Meglos" and "Full Circle" featured as part of the Doctor Who at the BBC Radiophonic Workshop compilation series. Eight albums of his library music work have been issued by KPM.

Discography

Commercial albums

Stock music library albums

Singles

See also 
List of ambient music artists

References

External links

Information about Paddy Kingsland and PK Studios
Blips
Article on Paddy Kingsland's score for Look and Read The Boy From Space
Marcus Parker-Rhodes, an animator working with Paddy Kingsland on several School's series
Cut-Out, an animation studio working with Paddy Kingsland on several School's series
Number Crew

Living people
BBC Radiophonic Workshop
British electronic musicians
1947 births
Nucleus (band) members